Sandiaoling railway station is a railway station located in Ruifang District, New Taipei, Taiwan. It is located on the Yilan line and is the terminus of the Pingxi line. 

The station is the only station in Taiwan not connected to a public road.

See also
 List of railway stations in Taiwan

References 

1922 establishments in Taiwan
Railway stations in New Taipei
Railway stations opened in 1922
Railway stations served by Taiwan Railways Administration